Béatrice Dalle (née Cabarrou; December 19, 1964) is a French actress.

Biography
Dalle was born in Brest, Finistère, France, as Béatrice Cabarrou. In 1985, she married the painter Jean-François Dalle, whom she divorced in 1988.

Working as a model when she met filmmaker Jean-Jacques Beineix, Beineix cast her in the lead role of the 1986 film 37°2 le matin (later released in the UK and USA as Betty Blue) which received BAFTA and Oscar nominations for Best Foreign Language Film, and made a star of Dalle.

She went on to appear in a series of major roles in French films, including the 1989 film Chimère, which was entered into the 1989 Cannes Film Festival.

She is seen in feature roles in the 1987 music video for Buster Poindexter's version of "Oh Me Oh My (I'm fool for you Baby)" and in the 1991 music video for "Move to Memphis" by Norwegian band a-ha. 

She starred in Jim Jarmusch's Night on Earth in 1991. In 1997, she was cast in The Blackout, her first film made in the United States.

In 2001, Dalle appeared in the controversial film Trouble Every Day, in which she played a vampire. She starred in the 2007 film À l'intérieur, in which she played a cruel psychopath stalking a pregnant woman.

In 1988, Dalle was interviewed by Clive James in "Postcard from Paris" where she said she was tired of Paris and wanted to move to New York.

Controversies
Dalle has been arrested on several occasions for shoplifting, drug possession and assault. In January 2005, while making a film about prison life in Brest, Dalle met Guenaël Meziani, serving a 12-year prison sentence for assaulting and raping his ex-girlfriend. She married him after 24 one-hour visits, and spoke on his behalf at hearings for his early release. According to a 2015 profile of Dalle, she said the marriage was "a complete disaster" once Meziani was released from prison, and their divorce was apparently finalised in July 2014.

Interviewed on the French TV programme Divan in 2016, Dalle stated that when she used to work in a morgue with her friends, they sold body parts of corpses, and while on acid, they ate a dead man's ear.

Filmography

Theatre

Further reading

References

External links

 
 
 

Living people
Actors from Brest, France
French film actresses
French television actresses
20th-century French actresses
21st-century French actresses
1964 births